Hangi Tavakoli (in Persian: فرهنگ توکلی); also known as Hangi; born as Farhang Tavakoli is an Iranian songwriter and record producer. During his active years since 2004, he had produced over 3,500 and written over 4,800 published songs for various artists including some major international hits. His productions are mainly known for his orchestral Middle-Eastern flavor. Still, he has also produced various pop and hip hop hit songs for over 150 Iranian and international artists. He is running his record label Flipside Productions as well as being an active member of Remote Control Productions.

Tavakoli's discography includes collaboration with names such as Hans Zimmer, Adele, Julia Michaels, Snoop Dogg, Ramin Djawadi, Junkie XL, Skrillex, Pitbull, Sean Paul, 2NE1, Rag 'n' Bone Man, Lukas Graham, Hozier, Shawn Mendes, Calum Scott, Imagine Dragons, Rita Ora and Sam Smith.

Early life 
Tavakoli has the sensory condition known as Synesthesia whereby he may "associate colors with music, or music with colors", and it allows him to visualize music.

Immigration

Hangi and his musical activities were considered underground under Iranian law. Iran's government had heavy control and filtering of the music scene at the time. Currently, he is running his record label, Flipside Productions, and producing songs for local Asian artists as well as making his own music.

Professional life 
During his active years since 2004, he was known as one of the founders of Iranian hip-hop and has produced more than 3,500 as well as written more than 4,800 published songs and has collaborated with various international organizations such as UNESCO (music production and conducting the music band for "UNESCO PEACE ART EXHIBITION & WORKSHOP" in University Science Malaysia (USM) in 2012) and Iran's Fajr International Film Festival.

He stepped into the MMA management world in mid-2021 and started Elite Team. He represents 15+ fighters in different styles and classes of weights from Iran, Brazil, and Uzbekistan.

Discography

References 

1990 births
Living people
Iranian composers
Iranian producers
Iranian expatriates in Singapore